{{Infobox planet
 | minorplanet     = yes
 | name            = 1233 Kobresia
 | background      = #D6D6D6
 | image           = 
 | image_size      = 
 | caption         = 
 | discovery_ref   = 
 | discoverer      = K. Reinmuth
 | discovery_site  = Heidelberg Obs.
 | discovered      = 10 October 1931
 | mpc_name        = (1233) Kobresia
 | alt_names       = 1927 TB1951 QJ1954 EG
 | pronounced      = <ref>Thomas Henry Huxley (1897) Universal Dictionary of the English Language</ref>
 | named_after     = Kobresia 
 | mp_category     = main-beltbackground
 | orbit_ref       = 
 | epoch           = 4 September 2017 (JD 2458000.5)
 | uncertainty     = 0
 | observation_arc = 90.15 yr (32,928 days)
 | aphelion        = 2.6976 AU
 | perihelion      = 2.4143 AU
 | semimajor       = 2.5560 AU
 | eccentricity    = 0.0554
 | period          = 4.09 yr (1,493 days)
 | mean_anomaly    = 117.22°
 | mean_motion     =  / day
 | inclination     = 5.6024°
 | asc_node        = 291.43°
 | arg_peri        = 335.02°
 | dimensions      =  km km km km33.45 km  km km km
 | rotation        =  h h
 | albedo          = 0.0396 
 | spectral_type   = CS 
 | abs_magnitude   = 11.3011.5011.5711.91
}}

1233 Kobresia, provisional designation , is a carbonaceous background asteroid from the central regions of the asteroid belt, approximately 33 kilometers in diameter. It was discovered on 10 October 1931, by German astronomer Karl Reinmuth at the Heidelberg Observatory in southwest Germany. The asteroid was named for the grass-like flowering plant Kobresia, a genus in the sedge family.

 Orbit and classification Kobresia is a non-family asteroid from the main belt's background population. It orbits the Sun in the central main-belt at a distance of 2.4–2.7 AU once every 4 years and 1 month (1,493 days; semi-major axis of 2.56 AU). Its orbit has an eccentricity of 0.06 and an inclination of 6° with respect to the ecliptic.

 Physical characteristics Kobresia has been characterized as a carbonaceous C-type asteroid by Pan-STARRS photometric survey.

 Rotation period 

Two rotational lightcurves of Kobresia were obtained by French amateur astronomer Pierre Antonini. Lightcurve analysis of his photometric observations made in 2004 and 2006, gave a rotation period of 27.76 and 27.83 hours with a brightness amplitude of 0.32 and 0.34 magnitude, respectively. While not being a slow rotator, Kobresias period is longer than that of the average asteroid.

 Diameter and albedo 

According to the surveys carried out by the Infrared Astronomical Satellite IRAS, the Japanese Akari satellite and the NEOWISE mission of NASA's Wide-field Infrared Survey Explorer, Kobresia measures between 29.73 and 36.167 kilometers in diameter and its surface has an albedo between 0.0305 and 0.0475.

The Collaborative Asteroid Lightcurve Link derives an albedo of 0.0396 and a diameter of 33.45 kilometers based on an absolute magnitude of 11.5.

 Naming 

This minor planet was named after a genus in the family Cyperaceae, Kobresia, a grass-like flowering plant, commonly known as "bog sedges". The author of the Dictionary of Minor Planet Names contacted Dutch astronomer Ingrid van Houten-Groeneveld in order to confirm the meaning of this asteroid's name.

 Meta-naming 

The initials of the minor planets  through , all discovered by Reinmuth, spell out "G. Stracke". Gustav Stracke was a German astronomer and orbit computer, who had asked that no planet be named after him. In this manner Reinmuth was able to honour the man whilst honoring his wish. Nevertheless, Reinmuth directly honored Stracke by naming planet  later on. The astronomer Brian Marsden was honored by the same type of meta-naming using consecutive initial letters in 1995, spelling out "Brian M." in the sequence of minor planets  through .

 Reinmuth's flowers 

Due to his many discoveries, Karl Reinmuth submitted a large list of 66 newly named asteroids in the early 1930s. This list also contained a sequence of 28 asteroids, starting with 1054 Forsytia, that were all named after plants, in particular flowering plants (also see list of minor planets named after animals and plants)''.

References

External links 
 Asteroid Lightcurve Database (LCDB), query form (info )
 Dictionary of Minor Planet Names, Google books
 Asteroids and comets rotation curves, CdR – Observatoire de Genève, Raoul Behrend
 Discovery Circumstances: Numbered Minor Planets (1)-(5000) – Minor Planet Center
 
 

001233
Discoveries by Karl Wilhelm Reinmuth
Named minor planets
19311010